The Cain II Ministry was the 62nd ministry of the Government of Victoria. It was led by the then Premier of Victoria, John Cain Jr., of the Australian Labor Party. The ministry was sworn in on April 8, 1982, and remained a single ministry through three parliaments until on August 10, 1990.

Ministry

13 October 1988 – 10 August 1990

14 March – 13 October 1988 
At the beginning of this ministry, titles "Minister of" were standardised to "Minister for".

8 April 1982 – 14 March 1985

Reference list

1982 establishments in Australia
Cabinets established in 1982
Cabinets disestablished in 1990
Australian Labor Party ministries in Victoria (Australia)
Victoria (Australia) ministries
Ministry
Ministries of Elizabeth II
1990 disestablishments in Australia